The British Coal Corporation was a nationalised corporation responsible for the mining of coal in the United Kingdom from 1987 until it was effectively dissolved in 1997. The corporation was created by renaming its predecessor, the National Coal Board (NCB).

History 

The Coal Industry Act 1987 changed the NCB into the British Coal Corporation. With the passing of the Coal Industry Act 1994, the 16th and last Coal Industry Act, the industry-wide administrative functions of British Coal were transferred to the new Coal Authority from 31 October 1994.

All economic assets were privatised. The English mining operations were merged with RJB Mining to form UK Coal, a monopoly. British Coal continued as a separate organisation until 31 December 1997, after which it was run as a residual legal entity by staff within the Coal Directorate of the Department of Trade and Industry, eventually being dissolved on 27 March 2004.

List of collieries

See also
Coal in the United Kingdom
History of coal mining in Great Britain
National Coal Board

References

Further reading

External links
Catalogue of the British Coal operational research archives  — at the Modern Records Centre, University of Warwick.

Coal companies of the United Kingdom
Defunct mining companies of the United Kingdom
Former nationalised industries of the United Kingdom
Energy companies established in 1946
Energy companies established in 1987
Non-renewable resource companies established in 1946
Non-renewable resource companies established in 1987
Non-renewable resource companies disestablished in 1997
British companies established in 1946

British companies established in 1987

1997 disestablishments in the United Kingdom
Defunct public bodies of the United Kingdom
Defunct coal mining companies